Buffalo Town Square Historic District is a national historic district located at Buffalo, Putnam County, West Virginia. It encompasses three contributing buildings all in the Greek Revival on the town square: the Buffalo Academy (1849), Buffalo Presbyterian Church (1857), and Buffalo Methodist Church (1870). The area was listed as a district on the National Register of Historic Places in 1991.

Buffalo Academy
Buffalo Academy was a school until the American Civil War when it was used successively by the armies involved. It later was restored and utilized as part of the school district as a public high school and then as an elementary school until the 1950s. It has been restored by the Buffalo Historical Society and a historical marker commemorates the building's history. Alumni of the academy included Coin Harvey and General John McCausland. George Rosetter was the school's first principal.

References

External links

National Register of Historic Places in Putnam County, West Virginia
Historic districts in Putnam County, West Virginia
Greek Revival architecture in West Virginia
Buildings and structures in Putnam County, West Virginia
Historic districts on the National Register of Historic Places in West Virginia